Presidential elections were held in Austria on 28 April 1963. The result was a victory for incumbent President Adolf Schärf of the Socialist Party, who received 55% of the vote. Voter turnout was 96%.

Results

References

Presidential elections in Austria
President
Austria
Austria